Rio de Janeiro/Galeão – Antonio Carlos Jobim International Airport , popularly known by its original name Galeão International Airport, is the main airport serving Rio de Janeiro, Brazil. In 2019, it was the country's fourth-busiest airport by passenger traffic. It is named after the neighborhood of Galeão. Praia do Galeão (Galleon Beach) is located in front of the original passenger terminal (the present passenger terminal of the Brazilian Air Force) and where the galleon Padre Eterno was built in 1663. Since 5 January 1999, it is also named after Brazilian musician Antonio Carlos Jobim. Galeão Airport is explicitly mentioned in his composition Samba do Avião. It is the largest airport site in terms of area in Brazil.

Since 12 August 2014 it has been operated by the concessionary Rio Galeão, a consortium formed by the Brazilian investor Odebrecht and Changi Airport Group, with a minority participation of the government owned company Infraero, the previous operator. The new concessionary has been using the brand name RIOgaleão – Aeroporto Internacional Tom Jobim.

Some of its facilities are shared with the Galeão Air Force Base of the Brazilian Air Force.

History

On 10 May 1923, a School of Naval Aviation was established near Galeão beach on Governador Island. On 22 May 1941, with the creation of the Brazilian Air Force Ministry, the school became the Galeão Air Force Base; a terminal and hangars were built and the runway extended. Those buildings still exist and Galeão Air Force Base is still active. When Brazil declared war against the Axis on 22 August 1942, the aerodrome began to be used intensely by the Allies for military operations related to the World War II.

At the end of the war, Santos Dumont Airport was unable to handle the increased tonnage of aircraft flying on international routes and number of passengers. For this reason, international flights were gradually moved to the site of the Air Force Base. The services were however precarious and a decision was made to build a brand new passenger terminal, opposite to the Air Force Base, across the runway.

On 1 February 1952, the new passenger terminal was opened and remained in use with enlargements until 1977. This terminal is used presently by passenger flights operated by the Brazilian Air Force. The cargo terminal is also located in the area and all-cargo aircraft usually park at its adjoining apron. The whole complex is now informally known as the "old Galeão".

By 1970, the airport was Brazil's major international and domestic air-hub. In that year, its administration was taken over by Infraero, an agency then recently created by the Brazilian government.

As proof of the airport's prestige, the Concorde made its scheduled maiden flight with Air France on 21 January 1976, flying from Paris–Charles de Gaulle to Galeão via Dakar. Those twice-weekly flights were discontinued in 1982. Furthermore, the 007 – James Bond production Moonraker (1979) shows the Concorde touching down at Galeão.

On 6 June 1967, in response to the growth of air traffic in Brazil, the Brazilian government initiated studies concerning the renovation of airport infrastructure in the country. As part of the conclusions of these studies, because of their location, strategic importance, and security issues, new passenger facilities would be constructed in the Galeão Air Force Base in Rio de Janeiro and the São Paulo Air Force Base in São Paulo.

On 20 January 1977, when the airport was receiving all of Brazil's major international flights, this new terminal was opened and all scheduled passenger flights were transferred to the new building. This building is known today as Passenger Terminal 1. One of the features dating from this time is the sultry PA system announcements made by Iris Lettieri, which were featured on National Public Radio.

In 1985, the airport lost the title of the country's major international airport to the newly-opened São Paulo–Guarulhos International Airport. At that time, a new runway allowing intercontinental flights with no weight restrictions was opened in São Paulo and Brazilian and foreign airlines increasingly used São Paulo as a national and international hub. As a consequence, the number of transiting passengers dropped. Constant efforts were made by the government of the state of Rio de Janeiro to reverse the trend. As a result, after stagnating for years embittered by the loss of domestic flights to Santos Dumont Airport and international flights to São Paulo–Guarulhos Airport, Galeão has – since late 2004 – gradually recovered its importance in the national and international spheres with addition of flights and airlines.

During the year 1991, Passenger Terminal 1 underwent its first major renovation in preparation for the United Nations Earth Summit held in 1992. Its annual capacity was increased to 7.5 million passengers a year. On 20 July 1999, Passenger Terminal 2 was opened. The airport has those two passenger terminals in elliptical format, each with twelve jetways and capable of handling 7.5 million passengers annually.

On 31 August 2009, the previous operator, Infraero, unveiled a 819 million (431 million; 302 million) investment plan to upgrade Galeão International Airport focusing on the preparations for the 2014 FIFA World Cup which was held in Brazil, Rio de Janeiro being one of the venue cities, and the 2016 Summer Olympics, which Rio de Janeiro would host. The investment was supposed to be distributed as follows:
Renovation of Passenger Terminal 1. Completed: 2012
Completion and renovation of Passenger Terminal 2. Completed: June 2012
Construction of further parking. Value 220.0 million. Completed: Late-2013

Like most South American airports operated by government-owned operators, Galeão had high operating costs per passenger. On 26 April 2011, it was confirmed that in order to speed-up much needed renovation and upgrade works, private companies would be granted a concession to operate some Infraero airports among them, on a second phase, Galeão. The plan was confirmed on 31 May 2011, and it was added that Infraero would retain 49% of the shares of each privatized airport. On 22 November 2013, the Brazilian Government had a bidding process to determine the airport's private operator from 2014 until 2039. The Group Aeroporto Rio de Janeiro formed by Grupo Odebrecht (60%) and Changi Airport Group (40%) paid 19 billion and won the competition. The contract was signed on 2 April 2014.

The new concessionary, Rio Galeão, has revised, modified and upgraded those plans to include the construction of a new pier with 26 new bridges, a new apron for 97 aircraft, and 2,640 car-parking spaces have been added in 2016–17, which would sum up to 2 billion reais.

One day after the closure of the 2016 Summer Olympics, Galeão handled an all-time record of passengers on a single day. It is estimated that on 22 August 2016, 85,000 passengers transited at the airport facilities.

On 10 February 2022, the concessionary requested the devolution of the facility. The request was approved by the National Civil Aviation Agency of Brazil on 25 May 2022. A new bidding process is expected to take place in 2023.

On 27 May 2022, TAP Maintenance & Engineering closed the facility at Galeão which it had operated since 2006. This maintenance center was previously owned by Varig. On 7 July 2022, United Airlines was announced as the new owner of the facility.

Airlines and destinations

Passenger
Since November 2016, the check-in and baggage claim areas of Terminal 1 are not in use. All passengers must use Terminal 2 to access the boarding gates of any terminal.

Cargo

Statistics

Accidents and incidents
27 July 1952: a Pan Am Boeing 377 Stratocruiser 10–26 registration N1030V operating flight 201 en route from Rio de Janeiro–Galeão to Buenos Aires–Ezeiza following pressurization problems during climb, a door blew open, a passenger was blown out and the cabin considerably damaged. One passenger died.
11 January 1959: a Lufthansa Lockheed L-1049G Super Constellation registration D-ALAK operating flight 502 flying from Hamburg to Rio de Janeiro–Galeão via Frankfurt, Paris–Orly and Dakar crashed during approach under heavy rain at Galeão. The crew descended below minimums. Of the 39 passengers and crew aboard, 3 survived. This was the first accident of Lufthansa after it was re-established.
22 December 1959: a VASP Vickers Viscount 827 registration PP-SRG while on approach to land at Rio de Janeiro–Galeão was involved in a mid-air collision with the Brazilian Air Force Fokker S-11 (T-21) registration FAB0742 in the vicinity of Manguinhos Airport. All 32 people on board the Viscount were killed, as were a further ten on the ground. The T-21 pilot parachuted to safety. This accident eventually led to the closure of Manguinhos Airport.
20 August 1962: a Panair do Brasil Douglas DC-8-33 registration PP-PDT taking-off from Rio de Janeiro–Galeão to Lisbon overran the runway into the ocean during an aborted operation. Of the 120 passengers and crew aboard 14 died.
1 January 1970: a Cruzeiro do Sul Sud Aviation SE-210 Caravelle VI R en route from Montevideo to Rio de Janeiro–Galeão with 33 occupants aboard was hijacked by 6 people who demanded to be flown to Cuba. The flight was diverted to Lima, Panama City and arrived in Havana two days later. There were no victims.
1 July 1970: a Cruzeiro do Sul Sud Aviation SE-210 Caravelle VI R registration PP-PDX en route from Rio de Janeiro–Galeão to São Paulo with 31 occupants aboard was hijacked by 4 persons who demanded the release of political prisoners that were to be taken to Cuba. The aircraft was stormed and the hijackers arrested. There were no victims and the hijacking lasted less than a day.
9 June 1973: a Varig cargo Boeing 707-327C registration PP-VJL flying from Campinas to Rio de Janeiro–Galeão while making an instrument approach to Rio de Janeiro–Galeão had technical problems with the spoilers which eventually caused the aircraft to pitch down, descended fast, struck approach lights and ditch. All 6 occupants died.
26 July 1979: a Lufthansa cargo Boeing 707-330C registration D-ABUY operating flight 527 from Rio de Janeiro–Galeão to Frankfurt via Dakar collided with a mountain 5 minutes after take-off from Galeão. The crew of 3 died.
12 December 1985: an Air France Boeing 747-228B, registration F-GCBC, arriving from Paris–Charles de Gaulle with 273 passengers and crew, veered off the right side of runway 15 on landing, crossed a ditch and collided with a concrete wall in the cargo apron. There was a fire that totally destroyed the aircraft, but all occupants had been safely evacuated before that, with no victims or serious injuries. The accident was later traced to a ruptured power control cable in engine #1, which made the engine accelerate beyond maximum takeoff power, destabilizing the plane.

Access

There are executive (blue) and ordinary (yellow) taxis available and bookable on company booths at arrival halls of both terminals.

TransCarioca line of the BRT integrated public transportation system links Terminals 1 and 2 with Terminal Alvorada in Barra da Tijuca with an intermediate stop at the Line 2 subway Vicente de Carvalho station, where one can access the entire subway system. At Alvorada one can transfer between the TransCarioca and TransOeste lines. The system operates 24 hours a day and tickets are sold in the BRT booths on the arrivals level. There are plans to connect the airport with the RioGaleão Light Rail, proposed to run between the airport and Estácio Station where it will connect to the Line 1 subway.

Viação 1001 operates the urban bus line 761-D from the airport to Niterói. Furthermore, the same company operates an executive service to Armação dos Búzios four times a day. Departure is from the arrivals level of Terminal 1.

Ordinary city busses 924 and 925 operate to the neighborhood of Ilha do Governador, and 915 to Bonsucesso. From both neighborhoods there are connections to the North and South Sides of the city.

Cacá Bueno Automobile Racing Circuit

In 2022, the Rio de Janeiro/Galeão International Airport was used for Stock Car Pro Series automobile racing. A circuit named after Cacá Bueno, Rio de Janeiro-born and 5 times Stock Car Brasil champion, was built within the airport partially using runways 10/28 for this purpose. This circuit contributed to the return of Stock Car Pro Series to Rio de Janeiro. It was the first race since 2012, when the race was held at Jacarepaguá. However, the circuit was not included into the 2023 Stock Car Pro Series calendar due to the increase of flights after the COVID-19 pandemic.

Gallery

See also
List of airports in Brazil
Galeão Air Force Base

References

External links

Airports in Rio de Janeiro (city)
Airports in Rio de Janeiro (state)
Airports established in 1923
1923 establishments in Brazil
Antônio Carlos Jobim